Josef Sieber (28 April 1900 – 3 December 1962) was a German film actor.

Selected filmography
 Pappi (1934)
 Punks Arrives from America (1935)
 Joan of Arc (1935)
 The Gypsy Baron (1935)
 The Last Four on Santa Cruz (1936)
 Men Without a Fatherland (1937)
 The Mystery of Betty Bonn (1938)
 Comrades at Sea (1938)
 Robert Koch (1939)
 Water for Canitoga (1939)
 Bachelor's Paradise (1939)
 Kora Terry (1940)
 The Three Codonas (1940)
 The Heart of a Queen (1940)
 Diesel (1942)
 The Big Game (1942)
 The Golden Spider (1943)
 Tonelli (1943)
 Artists' Blood (1949)
 The Last Night (1949)
 Five Suspects (1950)
 Harbour Melody (1950)
 Furioso (1950)
 Good Fortune in Ohio (1950)
 Shadows in the Night (1950)
 The Heath is Green (1951)
 Dreaming Days (1951)
 Shooting Stars (1952)
 A Thousand Red Roses Bloom (1952)
 Klettermaxe (1952)
 Ave Maria (1953)
 Not Afraid of Big Animals (1953)
 The Bogeyman (1953)
 Daybreak (1954)
 The Country Schoolmaster (1954)
 The Immenhof Girls (1955)
 Heroism after Hours (1955)
 Lost Child 312 (1955)
  (1956)
  (1957)
 Three Men in a Boat (1961)

References

External links
 

1900 births
1962 deaths
German male film actors
People from Witten
20th-century German male actors